The Cyclocross Crusade, currently in season , is a cyclo-cross race series based in Portland, Oregon held over an eight-week period during the months of October and November. As of 2005, the series was the largest cyclo-cross series in the United States. The 2006 series consisted of six races plus the U.S. Gran Prix of Cyclocross final (a Union Cycliste Internationale (UCI) sanctioned event).  The Cross Crusade began hosting UCI-sanctioned events as part of the series in 2002.

The first Cross Crusade was held in 1993, and was an expansion of a three-race series called First Mud, which had only included elite participants, and which had been held since the mid-1980s.

There were no races in 2020 caused by the COVID-19 pandemic. That was deferred to 2021.

References

External links

 Official Website
 "Mud, Sweat And Gears - How the once-obscure sport of cyclocross has exploded in Portland" Angela Valdez, Willamette Week, 11/6/2005 http://www.wweek.com/editorial/3201/6934/
 "Cross Crusade Moves to Horning's Hideout; 700+ Riders Expected Again" https://web.archive.org/web/20061106184908/http://www.cyclocrossworld.com/News.cfm?Action=Edit&MenuKey=14&theKey=831&ShowDisabled=0
 "Cyclocross Is Colorful. Mud-Colored, That Is." Oakley Brooks. NY Times. 11/25/06. https://www.nytimes.com/2006/11/25/sports/othersports/25outdoors.html?ex=1165122000&en=192117d95f87f53e&ei=5070&emc=eta1

Cyclo-cross
Cyclo-cross races
Sports in Portland, Oregon
Cycling in Portland, Oregon
Sports competitions in Oregon
1993 establishments in Oregon
Annual events in Portland, Oregon